Shoshurbari Zindabad 2 is a Bangladeshi romantic-drama film. The film was and directed by Debasish Biswas and produced by Bengal Multimedia Limited. It featured Bappy Chowdhury and Apu Biswas in the lead roles and Sadek Bachchu, Kabila, and Afzal Sharif played supporting roles in the film.

Cast 
 Bappy Chowdhury as Abir
 Apu Biswas as Ishana
 Sadek Bachchu
 Rebeka Rouf
 Afzal Sharif
 Kabila
 Harun Kisinger
 Chikon Ali
 Shahin Khan
 Mahamudul Islam Mithu

Production 
On May 13, 2018, the Muharat of the film was held at Priyanka Shooting Spot in Dhaka. Bappy Chowdhury and Apu Biswas signed for a contract for the lead roles of the film on February 8, 2018.

Music 
The film soundtrack composed by Emon Saha, Shree Pritam, and Akassh.

Release 
The film was scheduled to release on March 20, 2020, but the release was postponed due to the COVID-19 pandemic. The film was released on February 11, 2022 in 25 cinemas.

References

External links 
 

2022 films
2020s Bengali-language films
Bengali-language Bangladeshi films
Bangladeshi romantic drama films
Bangladeshi sequel films
Films postponed due to the COVID-19 pandemic